Bishop Rudolph Dubs (May 31, 1837 - March 31, 1915) was bishop of the Evangelical Association. In 1890-1891 he presided over a schism in the Evangelical Church and his followers were called Dubsites. His detractors were Esherites, followers of John Jacob Esher. His faction broke away to form the United Evangelical Church.

Biography
Rudolph Dubs was born in Germany on May 31, 1837. He married Elizabeth Wabnitz on June 4, 1861 in Louisa County, Iowa.

In 1890-1891 he presided over a schism in the Evangelical Church and his followers were called Dubsites. His detractors were Esherites. His faction broke away to form the United Evangelical Church in 1894.

He died on March 31, 1915 in Harrisburg, Pennsylvania from a heart ailment.

See also
List of bishops of the United Methodist Church

References 

1837 births
1915 deaths
Bishops of the Evangelical Association
German emigrants to the United States
Place of birth missing
19th-century Methodists